Park One is an office building at Kollárovo Square in Bratislava, capital of Slovakia, across the street from the New Scene Theatre. The building contains offices at the upper floors and shops and a restaurant at the ground floor.

History 
The building was under construction since 2006. It was constructed at the upper part of the park at Kollárovo Square, reducing its size and irreversibly changing the disposition of the square. The area, where Park One stands used to contain greenery, benches and a public transport stop.

See also 
 New Scene

References 

Buildings and structures in Bratislava